The Condor is the trade name of an amusement ride sold by HUSS of Bremen, Germany.  It was debuted at the 1984 New Orleans World's Fair, under the name "Cyclo Tower".

The Condor has 28 steel-framed gondolas, each with a fiberglass shell, frequently painted to resemble a bird.  The seats hold one to two people, one sitting behind the other if they decide to ride double.  It can accommodate approximately 1,700 riders per hour.  The automatic doors on the ride are operated by pneumatic air pressure and are manually opened and closed. The ride uses a cable and counterweight system within the tower to assist with the raising and lowering of the rotating assembly.

An AC induction motor located at the end of each arm rotates the gondolas; three more on the middle lifting structure rotate the entire assembly and move the tower.  To start the ride, most Condors require three buttons be hit at the same time to start the cycle.  (The operator in the booth uses his or her thumbs on the two buttons located on the panel, while an attendant in a location around the perimeter must be holding that one as well.)

Operators of the ride have options to operate the ride at different speeds and rotation configurations (forward and reverse), with the potential for unique computerized programs on each ride. These unique motions can also be controlled manually. Most Condor installations are park models. An exception is one of the few traveling models left in the world, Blume & Wollenschlaeger's "Ikarus-Der-Mythos". Ikarus was one of the fastest Condors still in operation, and featured different and unique manually operated ride cycles, usually with reverse rotation. Ikarus was taken off the funfair circuit and put into storage in 2007.

The Condor offers a scenic view combined with an exciting ride cycle, making it one of the most distinctive amusement experiences in the industry.  In 2007, Huss discontinued manufacturing new installations of the ride. In 2013, Huss re-introduced the Condor as Condor 2-G (2nd Generation).

In 2016, the first Condor 2GH (second generation hybrid) opened in Tivoli Gardens, Denmark. Called "Fatamorgana", it features both standard Condor gondolas and a "thrill version." In this variation, riders are seated in a ring, facing away from the center, and are spun around at high speed.

Installations

There are several Huss Condor locations throughout the world, including

References

External video
An on-ride video of Morey's Piers' Condor in Wildwood, New Jersey
Blume & Wollenschlaeger's 'Ikarus-Der-Mythos' at a fair in Tilburg, Germany
A combination of on-ride and external shots of Morey's Piers' Condor

Amusement rides
Amusement rides introduced in 1984
Amusement rides manufactured by HUSS Park Attractions
1984 Louisiana World Exposition